Rutul is a language spoken by the Rutuls, an ethnic group living in Dagestan (Russia) and some parts of Azerbaijan. It is spoken by 30,000 people in Dagestan (2010 census) and 17,000 (no date) in Azerbaijan. The word Rutul derives from the name of a Dagestani village where speakers of this language make up the majority.

Rutul is endangered in Russia and classified as "definitely endangered" by UNESCO's Atlas of the World's Languages in Danger.

Classification
Rutul belongs to the Lezgic group of the Northeast Caucasian language family. The Rutuls call their language myxʼabišdy čʼel.

History
Rutul was not a written language until the writing system for it (based on Cyrillic) was developed in 1990. A Latin alphabet was developed in 2013 based on the Shin-Shorsu dialect. Speakers are often bilingual or multilingual, having a good command of the Azeri, Lezgian and/or Russian languages. There are 8 dialects and 2 subdialects of Rutul. The literary version of the language remains in the process of development. In the Rutul-populated regions of southern Russia, Rutul is taught in primary schools (grades 1 to 4).

Phonology

Vowels

Consonants

Related languages
Among the languages of the Lezgic group, Tsakhur appears to be the closest relative of Rutul. Other than these two, there are seven more languages in the Lezgic group, namely: Lezgian, Tabasaran, Aghul, Budukh, Kryts, Udi and Archi.

See also
Rutul people
Northeast Caucasian languages
Languages of Azerbaijan

References

External links

Rutul dictionary online (select simple or advanced browsing)
Appendix:Cyrillic script
Folk Songs and Dances of the Rutuls of Azerbaijan
Rutul basic lexicon at the Global Lexicostatistical Database (3 Rutul dialects: Mukhad, Ixrek, Luchek)

 
Lezgian languages
Northeast Caucasian languages
Languages of Azerbaijan
Languages of Russia
Endangered Caucasian languages